Bedero may refer to the following places in the Province of Varese, Italy:

 Bedero Valcuvia
 Brezzo di Bedero